The Outer Ring Road is a proposed  road in the Amaravati Metropolitan Region Development Authority (APCRDA) spread over Guntur and Krishna districts. Guntur-Tenali-Vuyyuru-Amaravati urban alignment. It is being built by the National Highways Authority of India under Phase–VII of National Highways Development Project.

References

External links 
 National Highway authority of India website on Amaravati Outer Ring Road

Roads in Amaravati
Ring roads in India
Proposed roads in India